The 1933 Long Beach earthquake took place on March 10 at  south of downtown Los Angeles. The epicenter was offshore, southeast of  Long Beach, California, on the Newport–Inglewood Fault. The earthquake had a magnitude estimated at 6.4 , and a maximum Mercalli intensity of VIII (Severe). Damage to buildings was widespread throughout Southern California. The majority of the fatalities resulted from people running out of buildings exposing themselves to the falling debris.

Damage

Major damage occurred in the densely populated city of Long Beach on the south-facing coast of Los Angeles County. However, the damage was also found in the industrial area south of downtown Los Angeles. An estimated 75,000 mi3 area was impacted, being felt as far as San Joaquin Valley, Owens Valley, and Northern Baja California. The magnitude of the earthquake is considered medium, but a significant amount of damage occurred due to unfavorable geological conditions (landfill, water-soaked alluvium) combined with poorly constructed buildings. At Long Beach, buildings collapsed, water tanks fell through roofs, and houses were tossed off their foundations. School buildings were among the structures that incurred the most severe damage. Within seconds, 120 schools within the Long Beach area were damaged, 70 of which were destroyed. It was recognized that unreinforced masonry bearing walls were the reason that school buildings suffered so much damage. On March 20, 2008, a Los Angeles Times article stated that "the 1933 quake changed the landscape, leading to improved school construction standards and a heightened awareness of earthquake risks." Among other buildings, the La Grande Station, the main Los Angeles terminal of the Atchison, Topeka, and Santa Fe Railroad, was heavily damaged.

Aftermath
The earthquake highlighted the need for earthquake-resistant design for structures in California. More than 230 school buildings either were destroyed, suffered major damage, or were judged unsafe to occupy. Casualties would have been much higher had the earthquake occurred a few hours earlier while school was in session. Many schools were permanently closed for a long time due to the building being unsafe for inhabitation or not meeting earthquake safety regulations at the time. Since these schools were deemed unsafe, students would report to classes held in tents. Large sums of money were needed to upgrade these damaged school buildings.

Only 30 days after the earthquake, Governor James Rolph, Jr. signed the Field Act to govern the planning, design and construction of public school buildings. The Field Act mandated that building designs be based on high-level building standards adopted by the state and enforced by independent plan review and inspection. The plans and specifications must be prepared by competent designers qualified through state registration.

A group of local scientists, architects, and builders formed a Joint Technical Committee on Earthquake Protection to propose ways to minimize loss of life and property in future earthquakes. The committee was chaired by CalTech physicist Robert Millikan, and included architects John C. Austin and Sumner Hunt. In June 1933 they released their report, which advocated for stronger building codes.

The Bureau of Public Roads also took action to rebuild roads, highways, and bridges. The economy of Long Beach was able to return to normal swiftly because of the rise of the aircraft industry. To support the World War II efforts, Long Beach created naval yards and increased the number of aircraft produced. This directly helped Long Beach repair and stabilize the economy after the disaster.

This earthquake prompted the federal government to play an active role in disaster relief. The government created the Reconstruction Finance Corporation, providing loans for reconstructing buildings that were affected during the natural disaster.

The damage to the La Grande Station indirectly led to the construction of Los Angeles Union Station, which was built on top of what was at that time the Chinatown, Los Angeles.

Cause

A 2016 press release by the United States Geological Survey indicates that research shows the 1933 Long Beach earthquake may have been man-made, caused by oil and gas extraction underneath the city. Further studies indicate that several, if not most earthquakes during the peak years of Los Angeles's oil boom were likely caused by tectonic stress induced by methods used at the time which did not replace the millions of barrels of removed oil with other liquids.  A study done by the USGS suggests that drilling in a Huntington Beach area caused the 1933 earthquake. Other studies done by the USGS have also indicated that oil drilling may have been responsible for earthquakes in the surrounding areas in the 1920s. This study was done by two scientists that studied early state oil drilling records. They found that the epicenters of these earthquakes were located near areas where significant changes occurred in oil production areas. Man-made earthquakes are still an issue, especially in Oklahoma and Texas. Recent studies have shown that the injection of wastewater into the ground increases the occurrence of earthquakes.

Within the Los Angeles depositional basin, northwest-trending groups of faulted anticlines were viewed to be caused by oil and gas extraction underneath the city. The extraction of oil and gas produces salty water, adding stress to faults, causing earthquakes. Often wastewater and natural gas production will increase the magnitude of the earthquake making them even more dangerous.

The Newport–Inglewood Fault, the source of the 1933 earthquake, is a right-lateral strike-slip fault trending northwest-southeast, and parallel to other major right-lateral faults in California. The fault spans about 46 miles onshore from Culver City to Newport Beach, where it enters the Pacific Ocean. This fault is expected to produce an earthquake of magnitude 7.4. The 1933 Long Beach earthquake was only a magnitude of about 6.4, approximately ten times less vibration amplitude and 1,000 times less energy release than that of a magnitude of 7.4 earthquake.

Appearances in documentaries and popular culture
The 1933 film Headline Shooter, uses newsreel footage of the Long Beach earthquake. The 1933 documentary Quake! Its Effect on Long Beach and Compton California by Guy D. Haselton also features contemporary footage.

The earthquake plays a significant part in the novel The Last Tycoon (1941) by F. Scott Fitzgerald. During the disruption caused by the quake, the hero, Monroe Stahr, meets Kathleen Moore, with whom he falls in love.

The earthquake is also included in John Fante's Ask the Dust (1939).

Footage of the earthquake appeared in the film Encounter with Disaster, released in 1979 and produced by Sun Classic Pictures.

See also
 List of earthquakes in 1933
 List of earthquakes in California
 List of earthquakes in the United States

References

Further reading

External links

 USGS Historical Earthquakes – Long Beach, California – United States Geological Survey
 75th Anniversary of the 1933 Long Beach Earthquake – California Department of Conservation
 National Information Service on Earthquake engineering page about Long Beach earthquake – National Information Service for Earthquake Engineering
 Catastrophe: A Bad One – Time
 Long Beach Earthquake: March 10, 1933 Cloyd E. Louis – Internet Archive
 
 Image of workers clearing brick rubble from a sidewalk after the Long Beach earthquake, California, 1933. Los Angeles Times Photographic Archive (Collection 1429). UCLA Library Special Collections, Charles E. Young Research Library, University of California, Los Angeles.
 Watch Encounters with Disaster (1979) on the Internet Archive

1933 earthquakes
1933
L1933
L1933
Long Beach
1933 natural disasters in the United States
Disasters in Los Angeles
Geology of Los Angeles County, California
March 1933 events in the United States